Frances MacLennan (born 20 December 1943) is a Scottish former professional tennis player.

MacLennan, born in Glasgow, was one of Great Britain's top players of the 1960s.

A regular competitor at Wimbledon, she made it through the round of 16 of the singles in 1965, but her best performance at the tournament was a semi-final appearance in doubles with Robin Lloyd in 1968.

MacLennan is the former wife of tennis player Roger Taylor, who she married in 1969. The couple had three children.

References

External links
 
 

1943 births
Living people
British female tennis players
Scottish female tennis players
Medalists at the 1967 Summer Universiade
Universiade bronze medalists for Great Britain
Universiade medalists in tennis
Sportspeople from Glasgow